Mouatasem Alaya is a Syrian footballer for Al-Wahda.

References

 http://www.goalzz.com/main.aspx?player=8873

1983 births
Living people
Syrian footballers
Footballers at the 2006 Asian Games
Sportspeople from Damascus

Association football midfielders
Asian Games competitors for Syria
Syrian Premier League players
Syria international footballers